Oliver C. Dawson Stadium is a 22,000-seat multi-purpose stadium in Orangeburg, South Carolina. It opened in 1955, with major renovations in 1994. It is home to the South Carolina State Bulldogs college football team and the women's college soccer team.

The Bulldogs played the first football game at the stadium – then known as State College Stadium – on October 1, 1955, against Allen University. The stadium took its current name in 1984, named after Oliver C. Dawson (1910–1989), athletic director at the university for 16 years, and inductee of the South Carolina Athletic Hall of Fame.

From 2006 to 2009, the stadium served as the host of the South Carolina High School League's Class 1A state football championship games.

See also
 List of NCAA Division I FCS football stadiums

References

Further reading
Stadium review via scout.com

External links
South Carolina State Athletic Facilities

College football venues
Soccer venues in South Carolina
South Carolina State Bulldogs football
Multi-purpose stadiums in the United States
Sports venues in Orangeburg County, South Carolina
1955 establishments in South Carolina
Sports venues completed in 1955
College soccer venues in the United States